Brian Bartlett (born October 1, 1953) is a Canadian poet, essayist, nature writer, and editor. He has published 14 books or chapbooks of poetry, two prose books of nature writing, and a compilation of prose about poetry. He was born in St. Stephen, New Brunswick, and lived in Fredericton from 1957 to 1975. While a high-school student and an undergraduate he attended the informal writers workshop the Ice House (a.k.a. McCord Hall or Tuesday Night); there and elsewhere he benefited from the generosity and friendship of writers such as Nancy and William Bauer, Robert Gibbs, Alden Nowlan, A.G. Bailey, Kent Thompson, Fred Cogswell, David Adams Richards, and Michael Pacey. After completing his B.A. at the University of New Brunswick, including an Honours thesis entitled "Dialogue as Form and Device in the Poetry of W.B. Yeats," Bartlett moved to Montreal Quebec, and stayed there for 15 years. He completed an M.A. from Concordia University, with a short-story-collection thesis (advisor: Clark Blaise), and a PhD at Université de Montréal (dissertation: "Speech and Address in the Poetry of A.R. Ammons"). While living in Montreal, Bartlett worked as a proofreader, tutor, manual laborer, office assistant for an academic journal, and part-time instructor. In 1990 he relocated to Halifax, Nova Scotia to teach Creative Writing and English at Saint Mary's University. https://www.writers.ns.ca/members/profile/24<  http://www.stu-acpa.com/brian-bartlett.html  https://www.writersunion.ca/member/brian-bartlett

During his final dozen years of teaching, Bartlett edited several other poets' selected works, a compilation of essays on one poet, and Collected Poems of Alden Nowlan. After 28 years leading workshops in several genres (poetry, non-fiction prose, fiction), teaching fields of literature ranging from Study of Poetry, Study of Short Fiction, 20th-century Poetry, and 19th-century American Prose to Beginnings of Canadian Literature, Contemporary Canadian Poetry, The Writer and Nature, and Canadian Nature Writing, as well as overseeing the Saint Mary's Reading Series, Bartlett retired from teaching in 2018. A long-time dedicated reader of Thoreau, he has given presentations at Thoreau conferences in Concord, Massachusetts and Gothenburg, Sweden. His writing of poetry and prose, and his editing, continue. His wife, Karen Dahl (b. 1963), is a Senior Manager for the Halifax Regional Library system; their children are Josh (b. 1997) and Laura (b. 2000).

Publications

Poetry
Finches for the Wake. Fredericton, NB: Fiddlehead, 1971. 
Brother’s Insomnia. Fredericton, NB: The New Brunswick Chapbooks, 1972.
Cattail Week. Montreal: Villeneuve, 1981.
Planet Harbor. Fredericton: Goose Lane Editions, 1989. 
Underwater Carpentry. Fredericton: Goose Lane Editions, 1993
Granite Erratics. Victoria: Ekstasis, 1997. 
The Afterlife of Trees. Montreal, Quebec: McGill-Queen’s UP, 2002. https://www.mqup.ca/afterlife-of-trees--the-products-9780773519107.php?page_id=73&
Wanting the Day: Selected Poems. Fredericton: Goose Lane Editions, 2003; Calstock, Cornwall, UK: Peterloo Poets, 2004. https://gooselane.com/products/wanting-the-day?_pos=1&_sid=57cacbae0&_ss=r 
Travels of the Watch. Kentville: Gaspereau, 2004. http://www.gaspereau.com/bookInfo.php?AID=0&AISBN=9781894031974
The Watchmaker’s Table. Fredericton: Goose Lane Editions, 2008.https://gooselane.com/products/the-watchmakers-table?_pos=3&_sid=9688ce9f8&_ss=r
Being Charlie. Vancouver, BC: Alfred Gustav, 2009. 
Potato Blossom Road: Seven Montages. Victoria: Ekstasis, 2013. http://www.ekstasiseditions.com/recenthtml/potatoblossom.htm
Keatonesque. Kingston, ON: Thee Hellbox Press, 2017.
Safety Last. Kentville: Gaspereau, 2019. http://www.gaspereau.com/bookInfo.php?AID=0&AISBN=9781554472055

Prose
 "Introduction." Charles G. D. Roberts, Red Fox. 1905. Halifax, NS: Formac, 2008. http://www.formac.ca/Book/1365/Red-Fox.html
 "'A Many-veined Leaf': Minutiae and Multiplicity in Brian Bartlett's Poetry." Interview. Anne Compton, Meetings with Maritime Poets: Interviews (Markham: Fitzhenry & Whiteside, 2006).
Ringing Here & There: A Nature Calendar. Markham, ON: Fitzhenry & Whiteside, 2014. https://www.fitzhenry.ca/Detail/1554553318
All Manner of Tackle: Living with Poetry. Windsor, ON: Palimpsest Press, 2017. https://palimpsestpress.ca/books/manner-tackle-living-poetry/
Branches Over Ripples: A Waterside Journal. Kentville, NS: Gaspereau Press, 2017. http://www.gaspereau.com/bookInfo.php?AID=0&AISBN=9781554471782
Daystart Songflight: A Morning Journal. East Lawrencetown, NS: Pottersfield Press, 2021. [forthcoming]

Edited
Don McKay: Essays on His Works. Brian Bartlett ed. Toronto: Guernica, 2006. https://www.guernicaeditions.com/title/9781550712520
Earthly Pages: The Poetry of Don Domanski. Brian Bartlett ed. Waterloo, ON: Wilfrid Laurier UP, 2007. https://www.wlupress.wlu.ca/Books/E/Earthly-Pages2 
The Essential James Reaney. Brian Bartlett ed. Erin: Porcupine’s Quill, 2009. http://store.porcupinesquill.ca/essential_james_reaney 
The Essential Robert Gibbs. Brian Bartlett ed. Erin: Porcupine's Quill, 2012. http://www.porcupinesquill.ca/bookinfo6.php?index=270
The Child Alone. Brian Bartlett ed. With art work by Laura Bartlett. Victoria, BC: Frog Hollow Press, 2015. https://www.froghollowpress.com/catalogue.html#alone
Collected Poems of Alden Nowlan. Brian Bartlett ed. Fredericton, NB: Icehouse Poetry, 2017. https://gooselane.com/collections/all-books/products/collected-poems-of-alden-nowlan 
The Essential Dorothy Roberts. Brian Bartlett ed. Erin, ON: Porcupine's Quill, 2018. http://porcupinesquill.ca/bookinfo6.php?index=331
Bright with Invisible History: A William Bauer Reader. Brian Bartlett ed. Woodstock, NB: Chapel Street Editions, 2020. http://www.chapelstreeteditions.com/bright-with-invisible-history.html

Awards
Winner of The Malahat Review Long Poem Prize 1992, for "Underwater Carpentry."
Winner of The Malahat Review Long Poem Prize 1999, for "Hawthornden Improvisations."
Winner of Petra Kenney International Poetry Prize 2001, for "Foot-doctor for the Homeless."
Shortlisted for Atlantic Poetry Prize 2003, for The Afterlife of Trees. https://www.froghollowpress.com/catalogue.html#alone
Winner of Atlantic Poetry Prize 2004, for Wanting the Day: Selected Poems. https://en.wikipedia.org/wiki/J._M._Abraham_Poetry_Award#cite_note-winnerslist-1
Winner of Acorn-Plantos Award for Poetry's Poetry 2008, for The Watchmaker's Table. 
Shortlisted for J. M. Abraham Prize for Poetry 2015, for Ringing Here & There: A Nature Calendar.

References

1953 births
20th-century Canadian poets
21st-century Canadian poets
Canadian male poets
Université de Montréal alumni
Concordia University alumni
University of New Brunswick alumni
Academic staff of the Saint Mary's University (Halifax)
20th-century Canadian male writers
21st-century Canadian male writers
Writers from Montreal
Writers from New Brunswick
Writers from Halifax, Nova Scotia
People from St. Stephen, New Brunswick
Living people